The following is a partial filmography for LeVar Burton, separated into film and television work.

Filmography

Film

Television

Other work

Director

References

American filmographies
Director filmographies
Male actor filmographies